Luther S. Luedtke (born November 17, 1943) is an American author, educator, and non-profit executive.  From 2006 to 2015, he was president and chief executive officer of Education Development Center, an international research and development organization with headquarters in Waltham, Massachusetts.  EDC has been named one of the top 100 places to work in Boston.

Luedtke served as the fifth president of California Lutheran University from 1992 to 2006. During his tenure, undergraduate enrollment increased from 1,250 students to 2,000, and the annual operating budget grew from $29 million to $66 million. The university also established new academic programs in areas such as computer science, bioengineering, and business. In addition, he helped establish endowed chairs and oversaw the completion of six new buildings. He served as president of CLU for almost fourteen years, the longest of any past president. Prior to becoming CLU President, he served as a faculty member at the University of Southern California for 22 years.

Biography
Prior to EDC, Luedtke spent 14 years as president of California Lutheran University (CLU) in Thousand Oaks, California.  Prior to CLU, Luedtke spent two decades at the University of Southern California, where he held a series of positions as professor and director of graduate studies in English, chair of American studies, and director of the School of Journalism.

Luedtke was a Fulbright Lecturer in Germany, a Distinguished Fulbright Scholar and director of the American Studies Research Centre in India, and a resident scholar with the U.S. Information Agency (USIA) in Washington, D.C.  Additionally, he worked as a consultant for the U.S. Department of Education, the Council for International Exchange of Scholars, and other governmental bodies.

In 1965, Luedtke received a bachelor of arts summa cum laude in English from Gustavus Adolphus College and in 1971 received his Ph.D. in American Civilization from Brown University.  He is the author of Nathaniel Hawthorne and the Romance of the Orient and the editor of Making America:  The Society and Culture of the United States.  He also served as a member of the board of directors of Lutheran Brotherhood, since renamed Thrivent Financial for Lutherans.

Luedtke was born in Hutchinson, Minnesota in 1943.  He is married to Carol Luedtke, a former English teacher at Westridge School in Pasadena, California; they have two children: Pehr Luedtke, former CEO of PowerReviews in San Francisco, California; and Pia Luedtke, a mammography radiologist in Pasadena, California.

References

External links
The Boss, The New York Times

American educational theorists
1943 births
Living people
California Lutheran University faculty
Brown University alumni
Heads of universities and colleges in the United States